A new version of AmigaOS was released on December 24, 2006 after five years of development by Hyperion Entertainment (Belgium) under license from Amiga, Inc. for AmigaOne registered users.

During the five years of development, users of AmigaOne machines could download from Hyperion repository Pre-Release Versions of AmigaOS 4.0 as long as these were made available. As witnessed by many users into Amiga discussion forum sites, these versions were stable and reliable, despite the fact that they are technically labeled as "pre-releases".

The last stable version of AmigaOS 4.0 for AmigaOne computers is the "July 2007 Update", released for download 18 July 2007 to the registered users of AmigaOne machines.

AmigaOS 4 Classic was released commercially for older Amiga computers with CyberstormPPC and BlizzardPPC accelerator cards in November 2007. It had previously been available only to developers and beta-testers.

4.0 versions

The new version is PowerPC-native, finally abandoning the Motorola 68k processor. AmigaOS 4.0 will run on some PowerPC hardware, which currently only includes A1200, A3000 and A4000 with PowerPC accelerator boards and AmigaOne motherboards. Amiga, Inc.'s distribution policies for AmigaOS 4.0 and any later versions require that for third-party hardware the OS must be bundled with it, with the sole exception of Amigas with Phase 5 PowerPC accelerator boards, for which the OS will be sold separately.

AmigaOS 4.0 Final introduced a new memory system based on the slab allocator.

Features, among others:
 Fully skinnable GUI
 Virtualized memory
 Integrated viewer for PDF and other document formats
 Support for PowerPC (native) and 68k (interpreted/JIT) applications
 New drivers for various hardware
 New memory allocation system
 Support for file sizes larger than 2 GB
 Integrated Picasso 96 2D Graphics API
 Integrated Warp3D 3D Graphics API

Developer pre-releases

AmigaOS 4.0 (Developer Pre-release)
The developer pre-release version was a snapshot of AmigaOS 4.0 for AmigaOne. It contained HTML installation guide in English, German, French and Italian and the AmigaOS 4.0 SDK.

The AmigaOS 4.0 SDK allowed creation of new software and migration of existing AmigaOS versions 3.x source code to OS 4.0.

AmigaOS 4.0 (Developer Pre-release Update)

AmigaOS 4.0 Developer Pre-release Update came in the form of a full ISO image (?33 MB) which needed to be burned on CD-R(W) by the user and was intended to replace the original AmigaOS 4.0 Developer Pre-release CD for installation and for rescue purposes.
Release date: 10 October 2004.
Among the features:
 AltiVec support
 Improved compatibility and speed of 68k emulation (JIT not included yet)
 PowerPC-native Picasso96 graphics system
 PowerPC-native MUI
 USB support for input devices
 Drivers for AmigaOne serial and parallel ports
 Drivers for the SiI0680 IDE adaptor
 Printing support
 Improved audio hardware support, including new drivers
 Comprehensive bug fixes, speed improvements, added features and functionality across all system components

AmigaOS 4.0 (Developer Pre-release Update 2)

AmigaOS 4.0 Developer Pre-release Update came in the form of a free download for registered users. The update featured a USB stack update (i.e. mass storage support) and numerous bug fixes and enhancements to core components of the system.

Release date: 27 December 2004.

AmigaOS 4.0 (Developer Pre-release Update 3)
Release date: 14 June 2005. The following is a non-exhaustive list of the features of update #3:
 New kernel. The new kernel includes numerous enhancements, fixes and new features. It can now run a special variety of ixemul.library and thus run ixemul software.
 New IDE devices. IDE drivers are included for the VIA 686B on-board and Silicon Images 0680 parallel ATA controllers, and the Silicon Images SiI3112, SiI3512 and SiI3114 Serial ATA controllers.
 New Picasso96 graphics and monitor drivers. Limited gamma support is available in the Voodoo driver.
 PowerPC native Warp3D including new drivers for the Voodoo 3 (Avenger), Voodoo 4/5 (Napalm) and the Radeon 7x00 series of graphics cards. New drivers include single-cycle multitexture support (two simultaneous units on the Voodoos, three on the Radeon) with simplified and extended combiner modes, interleaved vertex arrays, up to 8-bit stencil buffer support (where supported by hardware), and more.
 WarpUp support. The new 3rd party powerpc.library emulates loading and execution of WarpUp binaries.
 New Shell and updated shell commands
 Updated ReAction GUI classes and new Intuition
 New Roadshow TCP/IP stack and updated eth3com.device
 All new version of the Sirion USB stack and usbprinter.device
 Updated datatypes and localization
 Updated Preferences programs

AmigaOS 4.0 (Developer Pre-release Update 4)
The most prominent features of the fourth AmigaOS 4.0 Developer Pre-release Update were the return of the screen dragging ability and the Petunia just-in-time 68k emulator.
Release date: 8 February 2006.
The new features in this pre-release include:

 New Warp3D with support for Voodoo 3/4/5 and ATI Radeon models 7000, 7200, 7500, 9000, 9200 and 9250.
 Petunia just-in-time 68k emulator.
 New Intuition with advanced features like flicker-free window redraw and new screen dragging features (among other things, screens can be dragged freely in any direction and will reveal other screens beneath even if dragged sideways)
 Updated ExecSG kernel and most of the system components
 New Input System allows the use of mouse wheels and the use of multimedia keyboards (with keys like volume control, play/pause etc.)

AmigaOS 4.0 (The Final Update)

On 24 December 2006, "The Final Update" was released. It came as an ISO image (≈45 MB) and had to be burned onto a CD. The CD is bootable and may be used as a standalone installation CD.

AmigaOS 4.0 Final Update introduced a new memory system based on a slab allocator.

Features of AmigaOS 4.0, among others:

 Fully skinnable GUI
 Improved 680x0 emulator
 Implemented JIT and improved compatibility
 Optimized, 10% to 50% faster
 Screenblanker system which supports external plug-ins as new blanker modules
 Removed TRIPOS (BCPL) legacy support
 Improved TCP/IP stack, including firewall capabilities
 Virtualized memory
 Co-operative memory protection
 CD–DVD writer support, including Mt. Rainier
 Integrated debugger
 Integrated viewer for PDF and other document formats
 Enhanced shared library model
 Improved input device support
 Support for modern hardware devices
 New USB stack
 New PCI stack
 Co-operative resource tracking
 Faster memory allocation system, similar to what is used on Solaris
 Support for files larger than 2 GB
 New version of AmiDock with plug-in support
 New CDFilesystem with Joliet and HFS support, DVDRW support
 HDToolbox replacement and new HD recovery tool
 Added support for Truetype and Postscript fonts, with optional anti-aliasing

AmigaOS 4.0 (July 2007 Update)

Release date: 18 July 2007.

Improvements of AmigaOS 4.0 July 2007 Update are:

 New ExecSG kernel. The new kernel includes, among other things:
 Guard page protected stacks. Stacks will have guard pages at their bottoms preventing stack underflow
 A new semaphore type called Mutex
 Support for the new pthreads module
 A new library that supports most of the POSIX threads (pthreads) API
 A new ELF library that implements UN*X-type shared objects and dynamic linking. Shared objects are files that are loaded during runtime of a program and become part of the program's memory image. They have access to symbols and procedures of the main program as well as any other shared object loaded.
 Python 2.5.1.

AmigaOS 4.0 for Classic Amiga (with PPC accelerator card)

AmigaOS 4.0 for Amiga 1200, Amiga 3000(T) and Amiga 4000(T) series of computers equipped with Phase5 PowerUP PowerPC accelerator cards was put on sale in November 2007. The feature set was equal to the July 2007 update with drivers for Amiga expansion cards and devices and some minor improvements (e.g. AmigaInput).

AmigaOS 4.0 February 2008 update for CyberStormPPC and BlizzardPPC

Update of AmigaOS 4.0 for classic Amiga computers addressed some issues and compatibility problems.

Release date: 23 February 2008.

 A new kernel that fixes outstanding issues with the Mediator 1200/Voodoo combination as well as some other minor bug fixes
 Support for all Mediator models, including the new Mediator 1200 TX
 Updated Intuition and Layers modules that fix a rare occurrence of graphics trashing
 Fixed queue-handler
 Two AREXX libraries that had been missing in the original release
 Updated RealTek 8029 network driver that fixes a lockup problem.
 A new version of DvPlayer SE.

4.1 versions

AmigaOS 4.1 was presented to public July 11, 2008, and was put on sale for September 2008.

This is a new version and not only a simple update as it features, among others:

 Memory paging 
 JXFS filesystem with the support for drives and partitions of multiple terabyte size
 Hardware compositing engine (Radeon R1xx and R2xx family) 
 Implementation of the Cairo device-independent 2D rendering library 
 New and improved DOS functionality (full 64 bit support, universal notification support, automatic expunge and reload of updated disk resources) 
 Improved 3D hardware accelerated screen-dragging

AmigaOS 4.1

AmigaOS 4.1 was presented to the public on 11 July 2008, and was put on sale in September 2008.

This is a new version and not just a simple update as it features, among others:

 Memory paging with software virtual memory scheme
 JXFS filesystem with the support for drives and partitions of multiple terabyte size
 New and improved DOS functionality (full 64-bit support, universal notification support, automatic expunge and reload of updated disk resources)
 Improved 3D hardware-accelerated screen dragging
 Hardware compositing engine (Radeon R1xx and R2xx family)
 Implementation of the Cairo device-independent 2D rendering library
 Improved Workbench functionality
 Reworked Warp3D Radeon drivers with new functionality
 Reworked AmiDock with true transparency

AmigaOS 4.1 Quick Fix

On 21 June 2009, Hyperion Entertainment announced the immediate availability of a "Quick Fix" package for AmigaOne, SAM/SAM Flex and Pegasos II.

Features include:
 Improved overall system stability
 Fixed shared object handling
 Fixed Radeon Warp3D graphics drivers
 Increased performance of IDE drivers
 Fixed JXFileSystem issues with file scanning
 Fixed Sam440ep Ethernet driver to work with hubs and Envoy.

AmigaOS 4.1 Update 1

On 14 January 2010, Hyperion Entertainment announced the immediate availability of AmigaOS 4.1 Update 1, the first full update to AmigaOS 4.1. Its features include upgrades to the following:

 Kernel – Offers more stability on Sam440, a more reliable and efficient memory management system and improved memory paging to and from hard disk.
 DOS – A new mechanism for launching preset programs for specific tasks, such as email clients and web-browsers (URLopen). Application tracking for ease of program location (AppDir: handler). Improved shared object support with significantly decreased loading times.
 Intuition – Improved window support, fading and rendering – including drop shadows. Reduced video memory consumption due to improved screen handling. New internal methods for better system "theme" support.
 System – Updated ASL requesters and imagery for a fresh new look. New notification system. Enhanced automatic detection of installed hardware (including DDC support). Improved support for external USB devices. Updated sound.datatype and wav.datatype. New screenblankers. Improved calculator with extended mode.
 Workbench – The new Startup preferences means no more copying files to WBStartup. A brand new icon set to complement higher screen resolutions. New window themes offering enhanced visual feedback. Scalable icons. Workbench auto-update feature.
 Python – Tested with the regression suite. Enhanced distutils module for easy installation of Python packages. New Amiga modules including catalog and icon. New OS module methods.
 MiniGL V2.2

AmigaOS 4.1 Update 2

On 30 April 2010, Hyperion Entertainment announced the immediate availability of Update 2 for AmigaOS 4.1 for AmigaOne, SAM440EP and Pegasos II for registered users.

Features:
 Updated Python.
 New Cairo 1.8.10 with partial hardware acceleration.
 Updated Ringhio notification system.
 New version of AmiDock with icon scaling.
 Several fixed system libraries.
 New version of the Python-scriptable installation utility.
 Some updated shared object files compiled and linked with the new V2 SObjs ABI.
On 17 May 2011, AmigaOS 4.1 for Commodore Amigas with PowerUP accelerators was released.

AmigaOS 4.1 Update 3
On August 29, 2011 Hyperion Entertainment made available 
Update 3 for AmigaOS 4.1 for AmigaOne, SAM440EP, SAM 460, Classic Amigas with PPC cards and Pegasos II for registered users
Final bugfixes and updates for AmigaOS 4.1, new features are reserved for OS 4.2
 Updated Installer
 Updated PATA and SATA drivers.
 Improved DOS stability and speed.
 Fixed shared object handling.
 Support for AmigaOne keyboards
 Updated Intuition and GUI components.
 Updated Finnish keyboard support.
 Updated AmiSSL certificates.
 Updated USB stack with USB 2.0 (EHCI) support.
 Improved Sam460ex support including sound driver.
 I2C support for the Sam440ep and Sam460ex platforms.
 Updated and improved Warp3D.
 Faster 2D graphics.
 Kernel fixes to increase stability.
 Updated MUI with many new features to make porting MUI 4 applications easier.
 Improved notifications support.

AmigaOS 4.1 Update 4

On December 22, 2011, Hyperion Entertainment released a minor update to correct many bugfixes from the third update of AmigaOS 4.1 and introduces something new.

 Introducing the new Emulation drawer with official AmigaOS 3.x ROMs and Workbench files. AmigaOS ROMs are provided for all classic Amiga models and the CD32 platform.
 Added RunInUAE contribution to utilize the new Emulation drawer.
 New scsi.device patch for Classic installations which enables internal IDE drives to be used for memory paging (SWAP).
 Added NoDriveClick utility for Classic users.
 Updated TCP/IP stack with much improved DHCP support.
 Updated MUI with various fixes.
 Various Workbench fixes.
 Fixed several USB issues.
 Fixed elf.library that could cause programs using shared objects to misbehave when unloading (e.g. Timberwolf).

AmigaOS 4.1 Update 5

Update 5 was first public release for AmigaOne X1000 on 28 January 2012.  Later on 16 August 2012 the Update 5 was released for the other platforms.

 Improved Warp3D and IDE drivers
 Optimized DMA copy support for Sam440ep and Sam460ex systems
 Improved Classic compatibility (support for Catweasel)

AmigaOS 4.1 Update 6
Update 6 was released on November 30, 2012. It was a rather unusual update in that regard that it included no bug fixes (except new IDE, Xena, and Kicklayout files for AmigaOne X1000). The update consisted mainly of a new and more efficient way of delivering bug fixes. A new "Update software..." menu item on Workbench will launch AmiUpdate which handles all future AmigaOS 4 software updates.

 Auto-update of system components through AmiUpdate.

AmigaOS 4.1 Final Edition

AmigaOS 4.1 Final Edition was released on 18 December 2014, New functionality in AmigaOS 4.1 Final Edition includes:

 Extended memory functionality (beneficial for all supported platforms even those platforms which cannot be equipped with more than 2GB).
 New Shell console. 
 New Intuition features including a new menus system with menu images and unlimited menus and sub menus.
 New Workbench features with updated context menus and thumbnail previews of images.
 Improved DOS functionality.
 New unified graphics library with RTG support which allows for (current and future) very substantial general and platform specific performance optimizations e.g. through the use of on-chip DMA engines (present on recently released hardware going back to the Sam440).
 Updated Python port.
 Installation graphics, new icons and back-drops by Martin Merz.
 Many minor updates, new other functionality and bug-fixes.

See also

 Amiga
 AmigaOS
 AmigaOS versions

References

External links 

Amiga software
AmigaOS 4
AmigaOS 4 software
PowerPC operating systems
Software version histories